AlphaServer is a series of server computers, produced from 1994 onwards by Digital Equipment Corporation, and later by Compaq and HP. AlphaServers were based on the DEC Alpha 64-bit microprocessor. Supported operating systems for AlphaServers are Tru64 UNIX (formerly Digital UNIX), OpenVMS, MEDITECH MAGIC and Windows NT (on earlier systems, with AlphaBIOS ARC firmware), while enthusiasts have provided alternative operating systems such as Linux, NetBSD, OpenBSD and FreeBSD.

The Alpha processor was also used in a line of workstations, AlphaStation.

Some AlphaServer models were rebadged in white enclosures as Digital Servers for the Windows NT server market. These so-called "white box" models comprised the following:

 Digital Server 3300/3305: rebadged AlphaServer 800
 Digital Server 5300/5305: rebadged AlphaServer 1200
 Digital Server 7300/7305/7310: rebadged AlphaServer 4100

As part of the roadmap to phase out Alpha-, MIPS- and PA-RISC-based systems in favor of Itanium-based systems at HP, the most recent AlphaServer systems reached their end of general availability on 27 April 2007. The availability of upgrades and options was discontinued on 25 April 2008, approximately one year after the systems were discontinued. Support for the most recent AlphaServer systems, the DS15A, DS25, ES45, ES47, ES80 and GS1280 is being provided by HP Services as of 2008. These systems are scheduled to reach end of support sometime during 2012, although HP has stated that this event may be delayed.

Models 
In approximate chronological order, the following AlphaServer models were produced:

Avanti Family

Sable Family 

The AlphaServer 2100 was briefly sold as the Digital 2100 before the AlphaServer brand was introduced.

Mikasa Family

Noritake Family

Rawhide Family

Turbolaser Family

Lynx Family

Tsunami Family

Titan Family

Wildfire Family

AlphaServer SC 

The AlphaServer SC was a supercomputer constructed from a set of individual DS20L, ES40 or ES45 servers (called "nodes") mounted in racks. Every node was connected to every other node using a Quadrics elan3 interconnect and the systems were designed and used primarily for high-performance technical computing. An AlphaServer SC45 supercomputer was still ranked #6 in the world as late as November 2004.

Marvel Family 
{| class="wikitable" style="text-align:center;"
|-
! style="width:60px;"|Model
! style="width:80px;"|Code name
! style="width:60px;"|# ofCPUs
! style="width:60px;"|CPU
! style="width:30px;"|CPU MHz
! style="width:30px;"|Scache
! style="width:55px;"|Chipset
! style="width:95px;"|Memory
! style="width:115px;"|Expansion
! style="width:75px;"|Enclosure
! style="width:100px;"|CPU Drawers
! style="width:85px;"|Introduced
! style="width:85px;"|Discontinued
|-
| rowspan="2"|ES47<ref name="HP-2004-06-01">Hewlett-Packard (2004-06-01). HP AlphaServer ES47/ES80/GS1280 User Information Version 3.0. HP AlphaServer ES47/ES80/GS1280 User Information Version 3.0</ref>
| rowspan="2"|?
| 1 to 2
| rowspan="2"|21364(EV7)
| rowspan="2"|10051150
| rowspan="2"|1.75MB
| rowspan="2"|?
| Up to 16GB
| 1 AGP5 PCI/PCI-X slots
| Tower
| n/a
| rowspan="2"|2003-01-20
| rowspan="2"|2007-04-27
|-
| 1 to 4
| Up to 32GB
| Up to 4 AGPUp to 32 PCI/PCI-X slots
| Rack
| 1 to 22-CPU drawers
|-
| ES80
| ?
| 4 to 8
| 21364(EV7)
| 10051150
| 1.75MB
| ?
| Up to 64GB
| Up to 8 AGPUp to 64 PCI/PCI-X slots
| Rack
| 1 to 42-CPU drawers
| 2003-01-20
| 2007-04-27
|-
| rowspan="2"|GS1280
| rowspan="2"|?
| rowspan="2"|8 to 64
| 21364(EV7)
| 1155
| 1.75MB
| rowspan="2"|?
| rowspan="2"|Up to 512GB
| rowspan="2"|Up to 64 AGPUp to 704 PCI/PCI-X slots
| rowspan="2"|Rack(s)
| rowspan="2"|1 to 88-CPU drawers
| 2003-01-20
| 2007-04-27
|-
| 21364EV7z
| 1300
| ?
| 2004-08-16
| 2007-04-27
|}

The AlphaServer GS1280 originally supported a maximum of 16 microprocessors. In October 2003, the number of microprocessors supported was increased to 64 and the supported memory capacity was doubled to 8 GB per microprocessor.

 References 

 External links 

 HP AlphaServer range
 DIGITAL Product Catalogue Winter 1997'', Digital Equipment International, 1997.
 Compaq Alpha System and Model Code Names (at archive.org)
 HP Introduces Most Powerful Generation of AlphaServer Systems At archive.org HP Press Release (2003-01-20).
 HP AlphaServer ES47/ES80/GS1280 User Information Version 3.0 (at archive.org)
 FreeBSD/alpha 6.1 Hardware Notes
 About NetBSD/alpha
 The OpenBSD/alpha port
 Debian Alpha system types

DEC computers
Advanced RISC Computing
Computer-related introductions in 1994
64-bit computers
Compaq Alpha-based computers